Falling Up may refer to:

 Falling Up (band), an American Christian rock band, active from 2001–2016
 Falling Up (book), a 1996 children's poetry book by Shel Silverstein
 Falling Up (film), a 2009 film
 Falling Up (Digby album), 2004
 Falling Up (Falling Up album), 2015
 Falling Up (Kevin Ayers album), 1988
 "Falling Up" (song), a 2021 song by Dean Lewis

See also
 "Fallin' Up/¿Que Dices?", a 1997 song by the Black Eyed Peas
 Falling Down (disambiguation)